Pinigin is a Russian masculine surname, its feminine counterpart is Pinigina. It may refer to:

Mariya Pinigina (born 1958), Russian sprinter
Pavel Pinigin (born 1953), Russian wrestler 
7976 Pinigin, the asteroid

Russian-language surnames